Rachel Haugh is an English architect who co-founded SimpsonHaugh and Partners with Ian Simpson in 1987. Her practice operates in Manchester and London. Haugh was shortlisted for the Woman Architect of the Year Award in 2015.

Rachel Jane Haugh attended Marple Hall School in Manchester and studied architecture at the University of Bath

Haugh worked on the Beetham Tower, Manchester a landmark 47-storey mixed use skyscraper which was completed in 2006 and One Blackfriars a mixed-use development under construction at No. 1 Blackfriars Road in Bankside, London, known as The Vase due its shape. Haugh has also worked on the redevelopment of Battersea Power Station and the overhaul of Granada Studios in Manchester.

Her clients include, Beetham Organisation, Berkeley Group Holdings, Downing Developments,  Manchester City Council, Treasury Holdings, Urban Splash, University of Manchester and University College London.

References

External links
simpsonhaugh.com

1961 births
Living people
Alumni of the University of Bath
British women architects
Architects from Cheshire